Grzegorz Piechowiak (born 14 September 1963 in Piła) – is a Polish politician, member of the III, VIII and IX Sejm. Member of Agreement.

References 

Polish politicians
1963 births
Living people